Blues & Folk is an album by blues musicians Brownie McGhee and Sonny Terry. This record was recorded in 1960 and released on the Bluesville label.

Track listing
All compositions by Brownie McGhee and Sonny Terry except where noted
 "Sonny's Squall" – 3:46
 "Red River Blues" – 3:22
 "Gone Gal" (Brownie McGhee) – 3:31
 "Blues Before Sunrise" (Leroy Carr) – 4:32
 "Sweet Lovin' Kind" – 3:13
 "Midnight Special" (Traditional) – 4:07
 "Take This Hammer Whup" (Traditional) – 2:54
 "Too Nicey Mama" – 4:19
 "Meet Me Down at the Bottom" (Traditional) – 3:44
 "Tryin' to Win" – 3:26

Personnel

Performance
Sonny Terry – harmonica, vocals
Brownie McGhee – guitar, vocals

Production
 Rudy Van Gelder – engineer

References

Brownie McGhee albums
Sonny Terry albums
1960 albums
Bluesville Records albums
Albums recorded at Van Gelder Studio